Hatching Mayflies is an extended play by The Hiatus released on June 1, 2011.

Track listing 

2011 EPs
The Hiatus albums